James Henry Gorst (August 12, 1922 – December 15, 2020) was a Canadian politician. He served in the Legislative Assembly of British Columbia from 1972 to 1975, as a NDP member for the constituency of Esquimalt. He died in December 2020 at the age of 98.

References

1922 births
2020 deaths
British Columbia New Democratic Party MLAs
Politicians from Victoria, British Columbia